Charles William Wyndham (8 October 1760 – 1 July 1828) was an English politician.

He was the third son of Charles Wyndham, 2nd Earl of Egremont and Alicia Maria, daughter of the 2nd Baron Carpenter, and brother of Hon. Percy Charles Wyndham. He was educated at Westminster School from 1767 to 1775, and in 1801 he married Lady Anna Barbara Frances Child Villiers, daughter of the 4th Earl of Jersey and widow of William Henry Lambton of Lambton, County Durham. They had no children. According to some, he "proposed marriage to a gentlewoman one day, married her the next and parted from her the day after" so offspring would have been unlikely.

At the 1790 general election Charles and his older brother Percy were returned as the two Members of Parliament (MPs) for Midhurst, a pocket borough in West Sussex which had recently been purchased by their oldest brother George, the 3rd Earl of Egremont.

Wyndham gave up the Midhurst seat in 1795, shortly before his brother sold it, in order to sit for New Shoreham. He held that seat until 1802, when his brother persuaded him to stand for the county seat of Sussex. He held that seat until he stood down in 1812.

Scandal 
Wyndham was the defendant in a notorious 'criminal conversation' (adultery) case, brought by Anthony Hodges, regarding his wife Anna Sophia Hodges née Acton. Hodges claimed he had been long separated from his wife on suspicion of her adultery, after which point she became pregnant. During the trial, which happened in Westminster in February 1791 before Lord Kenyon, Mrs Hodges was confirmed to be pregnant and living with the defendant. However it was argued that the plaintiff had not only known about the affair, but had prostituted his wife to a Mr Bouvier, and the Prince of Wales (later George IV) as early as 1784. The jury returned a verdict in favour of the defendant.

Wyndham and Anna Hodges had a daughter Caroline Wyndham (d. 1876), who married Rev. Hon. FitzRoy Henry Richard Stanhope.

References 

1760 births
1828 deaths
People educated at Westminster School, London
Members of the Parliament of Great Britain for English constituencies
British MPs 1790–1796
British MPs 1796–1800
Members of the Parliament of the United Kingdom for English constituencies
UK MPs 1801–1802
UK MPs 1807–1812
Charles William
Younger sons of earls
Adultery